The Greatest Hits is a compilation album by the band Earth, Wind & Fire issued in 2010 on Sony Music. The album reached No. 9 on the UK Albums chart.

Tracklisting

Certifications

References

2010 greatest hits albums
Albums produced by Maurice White
Earth, Wind & Fire compilation albums